The following is the discography of the Native American/Mexican American rock band Redbone.

Studio albums

Live album
Redbone Live (recorded 1977; released 1994) as Avenue/Rhino 71632

Compilation albums
 Come and Get Your Redbone: The Best of Redbone (1975) as Epic PG-33456 [2LP]; reissued on CD in 2014 as Floating World FLOAT-6221
 The Best of Redbone (1976) as Dominion/K-Tel 833 [note: re-recordings of their classic songs]
 The Very Best of Redbone (1991) as Epic/Sony Music Distribution 4679362 [UK import]; reissued in 2019 as Music On CD MOC-13719
 Greatest Songs (Come and Get Your Love) (1995) as Curb 77746
 Golden Classics (1996) as Collectables 5802 [note: this is a 2LP-on-1CD reissue of Potlatch and Message from a Drum plus two singles]
 To the Bone (1998) as Sony Music Special Products 28581
Wet Willie and Redbone: Take 2 (2002) as Sony Music Special Products 52777 [five songs by each band]
 The Essential Redbone (2003) as Epic/Legacy 86072
 It's Your World: Redbone's Greatest Hits (2009)
 Redbone: A's & B's (2023) as Beat Goes On BGOCD-1488 [UK import]

Singles

Other appearances
Guardians of the Galaxy: Awesome Mix Vol. 1 (Original Motion Picture Soundtrack) (2014) [features "Come and Get Your Love"]

Notes

References

Rock music group discographies
Discographies of American artists